Awantipora railway station is situated in notified area of Awantipora in the Pulwama district. It is the headquarters of Pulwama division of Northern railway zone. It is one of the four stations in Pulwama district, the others being Pampore railway station, Kakapora railway station and Panchgam railway station respectively.

History

The station has been built as part of the Jammu–Baramulla line megaproject, intending to link the Kashmir Valley with Jammu Tawi and the rest of the Indian railway network.

Design
Like every other station in this mega project, this station also features Kashmiri wood architecture, with an intended ambience of a royal court which is designed to complement the local surroundings to the station.  Station signage is predominantly in Urdu, English and Hindi.

See also
Srinagar railway station
Anantnag railway station

Notes

References

Railway stations in Pulwama district
Railway stations opened in 2008
Kashmir